Angus Weatherit Scott (16 August 1927 – 16 March 1990) was a British track and field athlete who competed  in sprinting events. He represented Great Britain at the 1952 Summer Olympics. He was affiliated with the Achilles Club. He was part of the winning British 4×400 metres relay team at the 1950 European Athletics Championships.

References

1927 births
1990 deaths
British male sprinters
Olympic athletes of Great Britain
Athletes (track and field) at the 1952 Summer Olympics
European Athletics Championships medalists